Jerry Woods is a former defensive back in the National Football League.

Biography
Woods was born Jerry Lee Woods on February 13, 1966 in Dyersburg, Tennessee.
He grew up in Racine, Wi.  Attended Park High School where he was a 3 sport athlete.  All State & All County pole vaulter and football player.  He was also an honor student. 1989 Graduate of Northern Michigan University. Holds a Bachelor of Science degree in Industrial Technology with a minor in Drawing & Design. 4 year starting Defensive Back. 2x Kodak All American, national player of the year nominee, 2x All Conference, Specialist of the Year, team MVP, 3x Most Valuable Defensive Back, 1988 Dean's List honoree, 2001 NMU College Hall of Fame inductee, 2x team captain. Served 2 terms on Alumni Association Board of Directors.

Career
Woods was drafted in the seventh round of the 1989 NFL Draft by the Detroit Lions and spent that season with the team. He spent the next season with the Green Bay Packers.
Played 4 years professional football, 2 in the National Football League (Green Bay Packers & Detroit Lions), World League of American Football (Barcelona Dragons) and Arena Football League (Tampa Bay Storm) as a Defensive Back & Special Teams player.

Previously employed at Graco, Inc (Minneapolis).  Since '98 he's been employed at Cummins, Inc (Minneapolis).  Both of his parents, Mary Koonce-Johnson (Kenosha, Wi) & Jere Woods (Missouri) retired from Chrysler, Inc.

See also
List of Detroit Lions players
List of Green Bay Packers players

References

1966 births
Living people
American football defensive backs
Barcelona Dragons players
Detroit Lions players
Green Bay Packers players
Tampa Bay Storm players
Northern Michigan Wildcats football players
People from Dyersburg, Tennessee